Leyland DAF was a commercial vehicle manufacturing company based in Leyland, United Kingdom, and a subsidiary of DAF NV. In February 1993, Leyland DAF was placed into  receivership.

History
Leyland DAF was formed in February 1987, when the Leyland Trucks division, including the Freight Rover van making interests, of the British Rover Group merged with the Dutch DAF Trucks company to form DAF NV which was owned by DAF Beheer (60%) and Rover Group (40%).

In June 1989, it was floated on the Dutch and London Stock Exchanges. The new company traded as Leyland DAF in the United Kingdom, and as DAF elsewhere. The company manufactured trucks at its plants in Leyland, United Kingdom and Eindhoven, Netherlands, and vans at its Birmingham plant in the United Kingdom.

Following the insolvency of DAF NV in February 1993, Leyland DAF went into receivership. Four new companies emerged from it as management buyouts:

LDV Group as a van manufacturer based in Birmingham.
Multipart Solutions, which was formed out of the firms parts company based in Chorley
Leyland Trucks as a truck manufacturer based in Leyland
Albion Automotive as a truck components manufacturer based in Glasgow and Leyland

Leyland Trucks and DAF Trucks (the Dutch successor to DAF NV) both later came back together as subsidiaries of the American truck giant Paccar.

Despite the company ceasing trading in 1993 Leyland Daf marque remains on some existing trucks until 2002

In July 1994, Leyland Technical Centre, formerly part of the Leyland DAF global test operations, and located close to the Leyland Trucks site also emerged as a management buyout. In February 2005, the company was renamed MI Technology Group and in 2013, the CSA Group. In June 2017, it was purchased by Spectris, owners of the Millbrook Proving Ground.

Vehicles

Vans
Leyland DAF 200 Series (1989–1993)
Leyland DAF 400 Series (1989–1993)

Trucks
Leyland DAF 60 Series (up to 18000 kg)
Leyland DAF 70 Series (18000 kg to 26000 kg)
Leyland DAF 80 Series (18000 kg to 38000 kg)

References

External links

 
Vehicle manufacturing companies established in 1987
Vehicle manufacturing companies disestablished in 1993
1987 establishments in England
1993 disestablishments in England